Rasbora ennealepis is a species of ray-finned fish in the genus Rasbora. It is endemic to Kalimantan, Indonesia.

References 

Rasboras
Freshwater fish of Borneo
Taxa named by Tyson R. Roberts
Fish described in 1989